Badr-un-Nissa Begum (17 November 1647 – 9 April 1670) was a Mughal princess, the only  daughter of Mughal Emperor Aurangzeb, and his secondary wife Nawab Bai.

Badr-un-Nissa is itself an Arabic phrase meaning "the Full Moon among Women".

Life
Badr-un-Nissa Begum was born on 17 November 1647, during her grandfather Emperor Shah Jahan's reign. Her mother was Nawab Bai, a princess from Kashmir Belonging from the Jarral Rajput dynasty of Jammu and Kashmir. She was the couple's third and last child. Her elder siblings were Prince Muhammad Sultan, and Prince Muhammad Muazzam (future Emperor Bahadur Shah I). At the time of Aurangzeb's second coronation in 1659, he rewarded Badr-un-Nissa with 160,000 Rupess.

She is said to be more educated than her sisters. She memorized the Quran, and read books on faith at the persuasion of her father. She spend her life in doing good things. She was loved by Aurangzeb for her marvelous character, etiquettes, and kind heartedness. She died unmarried at the age of twenty two on 9 April 1670, in the thirteenth year of her father's reign. Aurangzeb was distressed upon her death.

Ancestry

References

1647 births
1670 deaths
Mughal nobility
Mughal princesses
Indian female royalty
Kashmiri people
Timurid dynasty
17th-century Indian women
17th-century Indian people
Daughters of emperors